Amir Kolahdouz Hagh (born 7 January 1993) is an Iranian cyclist, who most recently rode for UCI Continental team .

Major results

2011
 1st  Time trial, Asian Junior Road Championships
 1st Overall Mazandaran Tour
1st Stage 4
2012
 1st Mountains classification Tour of Azerbaijan
2013
 2nd Overall Tour de Filipinas
1st Young rider classification
 3rd Road race, National Under-23 Road Championships
 3rd Overall Tour of Iran (Azerbaijan)
 3rd Overall Tour de Singkarak
1st Mountains classification
1st Stage 5
 10th Overall Tour de Langkawi
2014
 2nd Road race, National Road Championships
 2nd Overall Tour of Fuzhou
 3rd Overall Tour de East Java
 5th Overall Tour of Iran
 5th Overall Tour de Ijen
 7th Overall Tour of Japan
2015
 1st  Road race, National Under-23 Road Championships
 Asian Under-23 Road Championships
2nd  Time trial
6th Road race
 4th Overall Tour of Fuzhou
 5th Overall Tour de Singkarak
1st Stage 4
 5th Overall Tour of Iran
 7th Overall Tour de Filipinas
2016
 1st Overall Tour de Singkarak
1st Points classification
1st Mountains classification
1st Stage 4
 2nd Overall Jelajah Malaysia
1st  Mountains classification
 5th Overall Tour de Taiwan
 6th Overall Tour of Fuzhou
 8th Overall Tour of Japan
 8th Overall Tour of Qinghai Lake
 10th Overall Tour of Iran
2017
 1st  Mountains classification Tour of Xingtai
 2nd Overall Tour de Ijen
1st  Mountains classification
1st Stage 3
 9th Overall Tour of Iran (Azerbaijan)
1st Stage 4
2018
 10th Overall Tour de Filipinas
2019
 2nd Overall Tour of Xingtai
1st Stage 1
 3rd Road race, National Road Championships
 10th Overall Tour de Indonesia

References

External links

1993 births
Living people
Iranian male cyclists
Tour of Azerbaijan (Iran) winners
Sportspeople from Tabriz
21st-century Iranian people